Mohammed Tabra (born 23 December 1950) is a former Iraqi football defender who played for Iraq in the 1976 AFC Asian Cup. He played for the national team between 1975 and 1978. 

Tabra made his international debut in a 6–0 win over Afghanistan in 1975 in Baghdad.

References

Iraqi footballers
Iraq international footballers
Al-Shorta SC players
Al-Shorta SC managers
1976 AFC Asian Cup players
Living people
1950 births
Association football defenders
Iraqi football managers